The Estadio de Béisbol Charros de Jalisco is a baseball and athletics stadium located in Zapopan, near Guadalajara, Mexico.  It was built for the 2011 Pan American Games at substantial cost.   It opened in 2011 and received official certification from the International Association of Athletics Federations just days before the start of the Pan American Games. It will have a permanent capacity of 8,000, but will be increased to 15,000 during the games. It has an eight-lane tartan track as well as an adjoining warm-up track.

During the 2011 Pan American Games, it hosted the athletics competition. After the games, it was used as a concert venue and to host sporting competitions including baseball. On September 14, 2014, the Mexican Pacific League's Charros de Jalisco bought the stadium. The stadium hosted Pool D of the first round of the 2017 World Baseball Classic.

The stadium is also used by the Mexican Baseball League team Mariachis de Guadalajara since 2021.

See also
 Athletics at the 2011 Pan American Games

References

External links
 Profile

2011 establishments in Mexico
Sports venues in Guadalajara, Jalisco
Baseball venues in Mexico
Athletics (track and field) venues in Mexico
Venues of the 2011 Pan American Games
Pan American Games athletics venues
World Baseball Classic venues